Julien Rassam (né Langmann) (14 June 1968 – 3 February 2002) was a French actor.

Biography
Born Julien Langmann, Rassam was the son of French film director Claude Berri and brother of film producer Thomas Langmann. His father Claude Berri is Jewish, and his mother Anne-Marie Rassam, who was born in Lebanon, is Lebanese Christian. On his mother's side, he was the nephew of producer Jean-Pierre Rassam and Paul Rassam. His mother, Anne-Marie Rassam, committed suicide in 1997, jumping from the apartment of Isabelle Adjani's mother.

Career
Rassam's film work included Albert Souffre, Queen Margot, and The Accompanist, for which he was nominated for the César Award for Most Promising Newcomer in 1993. In 1992 he wrote and directed the short film Jour de colère.

Personal life and death
Rassam was in a relationship with actress Marion Cotillard in the late 1990s. He became a paraplegic in 2000 after an accidental fall from the fourth floor of the Hôtel Raphael in Paris, just three years after his mother committed suicide by jumping from a building. Rassam committed suicide in 2002.

Filmography

References

External links

1968 births
2002 deaths
French male film actors
French male screenwriters
20th-century French screenwriters
Male actors from Paris
Suicides in France
People with paraplegia
Film directors from Paris
French people of Lebanese descent
French people of Polish-Jewish descent
French people of Romanian-Jewish descent
2002 suicides
20th-century French male writers